Selci Đakovački   is a village in Croatia. It is connected by the D38 highway.

The local sport clubs include the football club NK Omladinac.

Populated places in Osijek-Baranja County